Vian Sulaimani  (October 25, 1993) is an Iraqi beauty pageant titleholder who won the Miss Iraq 2017 but she was dethroned for being married.

Early life and education
Vian Amer Noori Sulaimani was born in Al Mansoor, a town in the Baghdad Governorate, Iraq to a family of Kurdish origins.
She received her bachelor's degree in Computer Engineering and Software from Mustansiriya University.

Withdrawal of the Miss Iraq 2017 Award
On August 3, 2017, the Miss Iraq 2017 award was withdrawn from Vian for violating the rules of the competition, because she was married to a student named Aziz, a citizen of Irish nationality. During the registration she brought her passport where she was not mentioned as being married. Vian said during the recording that she was involved in a betrothal that had been annulled but was in fact married and now is separated or divorced. Therefore, Vian violated the rules of the international organizations that the Miss Iraq 2017 was licensed to.

References

1993 births
Living people
People from Baghdad
Al-Mustansiriya University alumni
Iraqi Kurdish women
Beauty pageants in Iraq